Alex Martelli (born October 5, 1955) is an Italian computer engineer and Fellow of the Python Software Foundation. Since early 2005, he works for Google, Inc. in Mountain View, California, for the first few years as "Über Tech Lead," then as "Senior Staff Engineer," currently in charge of "long tail" community support for Google Cloud Platform.

He holds a Laurea in Electrical Engineering from Bologna University (1980); he is the author of Python in a Nutshell (recently out in a third edition, which Martelli wrote with two co-authors), co-editor of the Python Cookbooks first two editions, and has written other (mostly Python-related) materials. Martelli won the 2002 Activators' Choice Award, and the 2006 Frank Willison award for outstanding contributions to the Python community.

Before joining Google, Martelli spent a year designing computer chips with Texas Instruments; eight years with IBM Research, gradually shifting from hardware to software, and winning three Outstanding Technical Achievement Awards; 12 as Senior Software Consultant at think3, Inc., developing libraries, network protocols, GUI engines, event frameworks, and web access frontends; and three more as a freelance consultant, working mostly for Open End AB, a Python-centered software house (formerly known as Strakt AB) located in Gothenburg, Sweden.

He has taught courses on programming, development methods, object-oriented design, cloud computing, and numerical computing, at Ferrara University and other schools. Martelli was also the keynote speaker for the 2008 SciPy Conference, and various editions of Pycon APAC and Pycon Italia conferences.

Bibliography

References
 This article is based on autobiographical material at http://www.aleax.it/bio.txt, released as GFDL.

External resources 
 Much of Martelli's writing can be found at his personal home page.
 
 Stack Overflow profile

1955 births
Living people
Google employees
Computer programmers
Italian computer scientists
Engineers from Bologna
Python (programming language) people
Italian emigrants to the United States